The Baker Wildcats are the athletic teams that represent Baker University, located in Baldwin City, Kansas, in intercollegiate sports as a member of the National Association of Intercollegiate Athletics (NAIA), primarily competing as a founding member of the Heart of America Athletic Conference (HAAC) since its inception in the 1971–72 academic year. The Wildcats previously competed in the Kansas Collegiate Athletic Conference (KCAC) from 1902–03 to 1970–71.

Varsity teams
Baker competes in 23 intercollegiate varsity sports: Men's sports include baseball, basketball, bowling, cross country, football, golf, soccer, tennis, track & field and wrestling; while women's sports include basketball, bowling, cross country, golf, soccer, softball, tennis, track & field, volleyball and wrestling; and co-ed sports includes cheerleading, dance and eSports.

Colors
They have only one official color: cadmium orange. The only other school in the country to have orange as their only official color is Syracuse University.

Facilities
 Alvamar Golf Course: Golf
 Cavaness Field: Softball
 Collins Gymnasium: Basketball, volleyball, and wrestling
 Laury Tennis Courts: Tennis
 Liston Stadium: Football, track, and select soccer matches
 Mabee Memorial Hall: Practice facilities (basketball), Cheer, Athletic offices
 North Park: Baseball

Mascot
The official mascot of Baker University Athletic teams is WOWzer the Wildcat. WOWZer debuted, as the new mascot, on September 8, 2007, at the football home-opener in honor of the University's sesquicentennial. Reina Murphy, a freshman from the Kansas City metropolitan area, won the University's name the Wildcat contest.

Notable alumni
 Mike Gardner, American football head coach
 George LaFrance, American football player
 Mike McCarthy, American football head coach
 Vidal Nuño, baseball player
 Tanner Purdum,  American football player
 Blake Treinen, baseball player

Notable coaches
 Phog Allen, basketball coach at Baker University, the University of Central Missouri and the University of Kansas
 Emil Liston basketball coach (1930–1945) and administrator, inductee to Basketball Hall of Fame, and creator of the NAIA college basketball tournament
 Charlie Richard, inducted into the College Football Hall of Fame

See also
 1890 Kansas vs. Baker football game, the first college football game played in the state of Kansas.

References

External links